Wanzleben-Börde is a town in the Börde district in Saxony-Anhalt, Germany. It was formed on 1 January 2010 by the merger of the former municipalities Bottmersdorf, Domersleben, Dreileben, Eggenstedt, Groß Rodensleben, Hohendodeleben, Klein Rodensleben, Seehausen and Wanzleben. On 1 September 2010 it absorbed Klein Wanzleben.

Geography 
The town Wanzleben-Börde consists of the following Ortschaften or municipal divisions:

Bottmersdorf
Domersleben
Dreileben
Eggenstedt
Groß Rodensleben
Hohendodeleben
Klein Rodensleben
Remkersleben
Stadt Seehausen
Stadt Wanzleben
Zuckerdorf Klein Wanzleben

References

 
Börde (district)